Somerset   is a borough in, and the county seat of, Somerset County, Pennsylvania, United States. The population was 6,046 at the 2020 census. The borough is surrounded by Somerset Township. Somerset is just off Exit 110 of the Pennsylvania Turnpike (I-70 and I-76).  Somerset is the principal city of the Somerset, PA Micropolitan Statistical Area, and is also one of two cities, the other being Johnstown, that make up the larger Johnstown-Somerset, PA Combined Statistical Area.

History
The Somerset County Courthouse and Uptown Somerset Historic District are listed on the National Register of Historic Places.

Somerset was a central stage for the Whiskey Rebellion of 1794.  Several rebellion leaders, including Harmon Husband, lived in Somerset.  The federal militia sent to put down the rebellion worked from its headquarters in the nearby town of Berlin.  The Whiskey Rebellion was the first major test of the federal authority under the newly adopted U.S. Constitution and under President George Washington.
A major fire on the afternoon of May 9, 1872, destroyed a significant portion of the town within just a few hours.
On September 11, 2001, United Airlines Flight 93, bound from Newark, New Jersey, to San Francisco and one of the four planes hijacked that day by al-Qaeda operatives, crashed near Shanksville, killing all 44 persons on board. It is believed that hijackers intended to fly this plane into the U.S. Capitol Building or the White House.
In July 2002, nine miners were trapped for 77 hours,  underground, by flooding in the Quecreek coal mine, just outside Somerset.  All nine miners were rescued.  The Quecreek Mine Rescue was chronicled by journalists from around the world and was televised globally.
Somerset Crater on Mars is named after Somerset.

Geography
Somerset lies at  (40.006920, -79.081297)  on Pennsylvania's southern border.

Somerset County is in Appalachia.

Economy
Somerset is headquarters to Drive DeVilbiss Healthcare, which manufactures oxygen concentrators and other medical equipment in a 152,000 square foot facility in Somerset.

Climate

Somerset has a humid continental climate that is affected by the high elevation, rendering it colder much of the winter than Altoona, Johnstown, or State College, despite being well south of these locations. Its climate is quite similar to those seen in northern Pennsylvania, although the average winter high temperatures are slightly higher. Somerset holds the June and November record low records for the state of Pennsylvania. Somerset is also the only place in Pennsylvania to receive accumulations of snow in June (other places received a partial dusting at most) when it received three inches of snow from the same polar front that caused it to drop to 20 degrees on June 10, 1913. Because of arctic air, powdery snow fell. It was photographed being swept off porches with brooms. That same cold snap brought snow to many other Pennsylvania communities, especially in the northern counties.

Demographics

As of the census of 2000, there were 6,762 people, 3,035 households, and 1,717 families residing in the borough. The population density was 2,466.0 people per square mile (952.9/km2). There were 3,313 housing units at an average density of 1,208.2 per square mile (466.8/km2). The racial makeup of the borough was 97.80% White, 0.70% African American, 0.09% Native American, 0.70% Asian, 0.03% Pacific Islander, 0.19% from other races, and 0.50% from two or more races. Hispanic or Latino of any race were 0.55% of the population.

There were 3,035 households, out of which 26.4% had children under the age of 18 living with them, 40.5% were married couples living together, 12.6% had a female householder with no husband present, and 43.4% were non-families. 38.6% of all households were made up of individuals, and 17.6% had someone living alone who was 65 years of age or older. The average household size was 2.12 and the average family size was 2.82.

In the borough the population was spread out, with 21.9% under the age of 18, 8.5% from 18 to 24, 26.2% from 25 to 44, 21.9% from 45 to 64, and 21.4% who were 65 years of age or older. The median age was 40 years. For every 100 females there were 82.2 males. For every 100 females age 18 and over, there were 79.2 males.

The median income for a household in the borough was $29,050, and the median income for a family was $41,831. Males had a median income of $28,339 versus $19,492 for females. The per capita income for the borough was $18,310. About 7.8% of families and 11.6% of the population were below the poverty line, including 15.7% of those under age 18 and 5.6% of those age 65 or over.

Media

Television 
Somerset is provided with local coverage from both the Johnstown and Pittsburgh markets. The Daily American newspaper serves the city and county.

Education
The borough is served by the Somerset Area School District. There are three private schools, St. Peter School (K-8), Apostolic Christian Academy (K-12) and Somerset Christian School . Somerset Christian School is located at the Somerset Alliance Church. It offers classes for  Pre-K - 12th grades.

Notable people
 Jeremiah S. Black, Attorney General of the United States (1857–1860) and U.S. Secretary of State (1860–1861)
 Jacob M. Campbell (1821–1888), U.S. Congressman (1881–1887) and Civil War officer
George Chorpenning (1820–1894), transportation pioneer
Charles H. Ealy (1884–1947), president pro tempore of the Pennsylvania Senate (1941–1944)
Chauncey Forward (1793–1839), U.S. Congressman
Alexander Ogle (1766–1832), U.S. Congressman
 Charles Ogle (1798–1841), Whig congressman and orator
 Edward Scull (1818–1900), U.S. Congressman
 Pete Zorn, musician and member of Richard Thompson's backing band
 Keith Malley, co-host of the long-running podcast Keith and the Girl

References

External links

 Somerset Borough

Boroughs in Somerset County, Pennsylvania
County seats in Pennsylvania
Populated places established in 1795
1804 establishments in Pennsylvania